Yttygran Island (Eskimo–Aleut: Siklyuk) is an island in the Bering Sea  northwest of Cape Chaplino, close to the coast of Chukotka.

Nowadays this island is popular with ecotourists. Beluga whales are common in the waters around Yttigran and neighbouring Arakamchechen islands.

Geography
Penkigney Bay lies to the NW of the island.

It has a mountainous interior.

Administration
Administratively Yttygran Island belongs to Providensky District, part the Chukotka Autonomous Okrug of the Russian Federation.

Whale Bone Alley
Situated on the northern shore of Yttygran island (from the Chukchi Etgyran, meaning "midway dwellings"), Whale Bone Alley consists of a large number of carefully arranged whale skulls, whale bones and stones, along with a considerable number of meat storage pits. It is thought that Whale Bone Alley was used as a central shrine by a number of different villages dotted along the eastern Chukotkan coast. It is thought that the site was used for initiation rituals and for sporting contests, although the local Yupik have a simpler explanation that the island was simply a collective centre for the flensing, butchery and storage of whale meat, an idea supported by the etymology of the Yupik name for Yttygran: Sikliuk, from Siklyugak, meaning "meat pit" in Yupik.

The site is monumental by Chukotkan standards when compared with other early settlements such as Uelen, Ekven, Sireniki and Kivak, and consists of several lines of whale skulls and jaw bones along the shoreline, several large pits behind them and a number of meat pits surrounding a central sanctuary and stone path around one third of the way along the site travelling from south to north.

The site extends some 1800 feet (548 metres) along the northern coast of  Yttygran Island and lies on a major whale migration path, and it is thought that the site was chosen partly because of the ease by which local people could kill and butcher a whale and also as a place where people could come together and trade on neutral ground in a forerunner to the fairs held during the period of cossack exploration of the region.

There is no evidence of any monumental ritual centre like this elsewhere in any other part of Eskimo lands, though there are sites along the Chukotkan coast where the whale skull motifs can be seen at sites such as Nykhsirak.

References

External links
Location
Yttigran
Tourism

Islands of Chukotka Autonomous Okrug
Islands of the Bering Sea
Providensky District